Vinciguerria attenuata, commonly known as the slender lightfish, is a small species of ray-finned fish in the family Phosichthyidae, found in deep water in warmer parts of the Atlantic, the Indian and Pacific Oceans.

Description
The eyes are slightly tubular and set close together, giving vision both upwards and sideways. The mouth is large, with a single row of teeth, some long and some short. The dorsal fin has 13 to 15 soft rays and is set in front of a small adipose fin (a small fleshy fin without supporting rays). The pectoral fins have 9 to 10 soft rays, the pelvic fins 6 to 7 and the anal fin 13 to 16. There are photophores (light-producing organs) on the lower half of the head and in rows on the underside of the fish. The dorsal surface of the body is dark, the flanks are silvery and the fins are colourless, without streaks.

Distribution and habitat

Ecology
The diet of V. attenuata consists of planktonic organisms, particularly crustaceans such as copepods. The sexes are separate and breeding takes place throughout the year, but mostly in spring and summer. Both eggs and larvae form part of the plankton.

References

Vinciguerria
Taxa named by Anastasio Cocco
Fish described in 1838